Berat is a rural locality in the Southern Downs Region, Queensland, Australia.

History 
Dalrymple Creek Provisional School opened on 15 June 1887. In 1890 it became Dalrymple Creek State School. In 1907 the name was changed to Forest Plains State School. In 1914 it was renamed Berat State School. It closed on 9 October 1944.

References 

Southern Downs Region
Localities in Queensland